An eleven-part referendum was held in Ecuador on 26 November 1995. Voters were asked whether they approved of the decentralisation of social and healthcare authorities, the privatisation of social security, equalising public spending between the provinces, abolishing civil servants' right to strike, whether the President should have the authority to dissolve the National Assembly, whether local councils should have a four-year term of office, whether the President and Vice-President of the National Assembly should only serve two-year terms, whether eight constitutional reforms proposed by President Sixto Durán Ballén should be approved, certain reforms to the judiciary, legal rights for civil servants and the creation of a Constitutional Court. All eleven proposals were rejected.

Background
Amidst a political crisis that resulted in the attempted impeachment, and later resignation and exile of Vicepresident Alberto Dahik, on 20 September 1995 President Durán Ballén called for a referendum with eleven questions for voters. Eight were advisory questions held under article 79 of the constitution, which allowed the President to submit questions of "national importance" to voters, but the results were not binding for the National Assembly.

The other three questions (on judicial reform, the establishment of a Constitutional Court and legal rights for civil servants) were held under article 149 of the constitution, which allowed the President to put constitutional changes to voters after the National Assembly had not approved them within 90 days (the proposals had been submitted to the Assembly in 1994). The results of those three questions were binding.

Results

References

Referendums in Ecuador
1995 in Ecuador
1995 referendums
Privatisation referendums
Privatization in Ecuador
Constitutional referendums in Ecuador